Jardin des Curiosités is a  park in Saint-Just, Lyon. It is also called Jardin de Montréal, Belvédère Abbé Larue, Jardin de proximité Montréal and Jardin du Belvédère.

History 
The park was a gift from the city of Montréal, to mark the twentieth anniversary of the designation of Montréal and Lyon as sister cities. The park was opened to visitors in August 2001.

Designers include Québécois sculptor Michel Goulet, a Montréal-based architectural and urban design agency founded by Réal Lestage and Renée Daoust, and the Canadian company "Vlan Paysages", directed by Julie Saint-Arnault and Micheline Clouard.

Features 
The park is situated on Fourvière hill with a panoramic view of Lyon. There are six chair sculptures created by Michel Goulet, with inscriptions suggesting ways to contemplate the "real", the "absent" and the "imagined".

See also 

 Parks in Lyon

References

External links

Rhone Tourism Website for Jardin des Curiosités 

5th arrondissement of Lyon
Parks in Lyon
2000 establishments in France